The Brunner Pouter is a breed of fancy pigeon developed over many years of selective breeding. Brunner Pouters along with other varieties of domesticated pigeons are all descendants from the rock pigeon (Columba livia).
The breed is one of the most popular blower breeds.

See also 

List of pigeon breeds
Brunn

References

Pigeon breeds